Rotondi is an Italian surname. Notable people with the surname include:

Carlos Rotondi (born 1997), Argentine footballer
Gianfranco Rotondi (born 1960), Italian politician
Jim Rotondi (born 1962), American jazz trumpeter
Samuel Rotondi (born 1946), American lawyer and politician

Italian-language surnames